The list of Ramsar sites in Honduras includes wetlands in Honduras that are considered to be of "international importance" under the Ramsar Convention.
For a full list of all Ramsar sites worldwide, see the Ramsar list of wetlands of international importance.

List of Ramsar sites

See also
 Ramsar Convention
 List of Ramsar sites worldwide

References



 
Honduras
Ramsar